Elohim the Archetype (Original) Pattern of the Universe is a collection of four volumes based on the teachings presented by Henry Clifford Kinley from 1930 to 1976. Kinley is the founder of the Institute of Divine Metaphysical Research.

Publication
The book was originally published in 1961, under the title God the Archetype (Original) Pattern of the Universe. The first revision of the book was retitled Elohim the Archetype (Original) Pattern of the Universe. The Archetype is still in print today and is currently published and distributed by the Institute. Though the volumes were rearranged in Elohim the Archetype, the titles of each volume of God the Archetype are as follows:

 "Elohim, The Archetype (Original) Pattern of the Universe"
 "The Mystery Of Righteousness, The Mystery Of Iniquity, and The Mark Of The Beast"
 "The Mission Of John the Baptist and Yahshua the Messiah"
 "Whose Builder and Maker Is Elohim"

Copyright status
In the United States, the first edition of God the Archetype (Original) Pattern of the Universe has passed out of copyright and is in the public domain. However, this is not the case for Elohim the Archetype (Original) Pattern of the Universe. The second and subsequent editions copyright are held by the Institute of Divine Metaphysical Research.

References
 Henry Clifford Kinley Elohim the Archetype (Original) Pattern of the Universe. Revised in 2006 by the Institute of Divine Metaphysical Research.
 A Living Testimony: The History and Biography of Dr. Henry Clifford Kinley. Published in 2005 by Kinley Davis & Associates, LLC.  (limited)
 ThePatternOfEverything.Org containing Kinley manuscripts from the 1940s to 1975.
 IDMR.Net the Official Website of the Institute of Divine Metaphysical Research.
 AyahAsherAyah an unofficial Website of the Institute of Divine Metaphysical Research.

Christian theology books
Sacred Name Movement